

Prior to 20th century

 1418 - First mention of Tirana in Venetian documents.
 1572 - Tirana mentioned as "Borgo di Tirana" - Tirana-burgh.
 17th C. Founded.
 1614 - Sulejman Bargjini built a hammam, bakery, and mosque, transforming the settlement into a commercial center of the area.
 1750 - Kokonozi Mosque is built.
 1780 - Saint Procopius Church of Tirana established.
 1820 - Kapllan Pasha Tomb is built.
 1822 - Et'hem Bey Mosque and Clock Tower of Tirana built.
 1865
 Municipal Council created (approximate date).
 St. Mary's Catholic Church built.

20th century

 1905 - Population: about 12,000.
 1912 - 26 November: The Albanian flag is raised, two days before the Albanian Declaration of Independence in Vlorë.
 1913 - Zyber Hallulli becomes mayor.
 1917 - 28 November: "Streha Vorfnore", the first public orphanage in Albania was established.
 1918 - 19–20 December: Congress of Tirana took place, a preparatory for the Congress of Durrës.
 1920 - 9 February: Tirana becomes provisional capital of Albania.
 1921 - Albanian Vocational School founded.
 1922
 National Library headquartered in Tirana.
 Albanian Orthodox Church gained its independence.
 1923 - Muslim Community of Albania headquartered in Tirana.
 1925
Bektashi order moved its headquarters in Tirana.
31 December: Tirana becomes permanent capital of Albania.
 1926 - 27 November: Italian-Albanian  signed in Tirana.
 1927 - 22 November: Italian-Albanian military  signed in Tirana.
 1929 - Orthodox Autocephalous Church of Albania headquartered in Tirana.
 1930 - Dëshmorët e Kombit Boulevard laid out.
 1938 - Radio Tirana begins broadcasting.
 1939
 Italian occupation begins.
 Kosovo cinema opens.
 Sacred Heart Church built.
 1941
 Communist Party of Albania headquartered in Tirana.
 Presidential Palace construction completed.
 1942 - Zëri i Popullit newspaper begins publication.
 1943
 Italian occupation ends.
 Bashkimi newspaper begins publication.
 1945 - State Professional Theatre active.
 1946 - Teachers' college opens.
 1948 - National Archaeological Museum opened.
 1949 - Durrës-Tirana railway begins operating.
 1950 - Rinia Park created.
 1951
 Higher Agricultural Institute established.
 Polytechnic University of Tirana established.
 1953 - National Theatre of Opera and Ballet of Albania founded.
 1954 - Gallery of Figurative Art opens.
 1955/56 - Grand Park of Tirana built.
 1957 - State University of Tirana established.
 1963 - Palace of Culture of Tirana built.
 1966 - High Institute of Arts founded.
 1968 - Skanderbeg Monument erected in Skanderbeg Square.
 1971 - University's Botanical Gardens of Tirana created.
 1972 - Academy of Sciences of Albania headquartered in city.
 1979
 Tirana International Hotel opened.
 Population: 189,000.
 1981 - National History Museum opens.
 1986 - Palace of Congresses built.
 1988
 International Center of Culture opens.
  erected.
 1989 - Population: 238,057.
 1990 - December: Student strike.
 1991
 Koha Jonë newspaper begins publication.
 Polytechnic University of Tirana active.
 Confederation of Trade Unions (Albania) headquartered in Tirana.
 Tirana International School founded.
 Enver Hoxha's statue is torn down by protesters.
 1992 - Prefecture of Tirana created.
 1996 - Tirana Bank founded.
 1997 - January: Albanian Rebellion of 1997 begins.
 2000 - Design of Tirana Coat of Arms adopted.

21st century

 2001
 St Paul's Cathedral (Tirana) built.
 Population: 343,078.
 2006 - European University of Tirana established.
 2008 - 10 March: Centre of Albanological Studies established.
 2011
 January: 2011 Albanian opposition demonstrations.
 8 May: Albanian local elections, 2011 held.
 Lulzim Basha becomes mayor.
 Population: 418,495.
 2012
 Resurrection Cathedral, Tirana built.
 TID Tower built (approximate date).
 2013 - University of Medicine opened.
 2015
 Erion Veliaj becomes mayor.
 Maritim Plaza (luxury hotel) construction completed.

See also
 Tirana history
 List of mayors of Tirana

References

This article incorporates information from the Albanian Wikipedia and German Wikipedia.

Bibliography

in English

in other languages

External links

History of Tirana
Tirana
Albania history-related lists
Years in Albania
Tirana